Stiffed may refer to:

 Stiffed (band), an American punk rock band
 Stiffed: The Betrayal of the American Man, a 1999 book about late-20th-century American masculinity by Susan Faludi